Imke de Pater is a Dutch astronomer working at the University of California, Berkeley. She is known for her research on the large planets and led the team using the Keck Telescope to image the 1994 impact of the comet Comet Shoemaker–Levy 9 with Jupiter.

Education and career 
De Pater was introduced to astronomy in high school when a family friend gave her an astronomy textbook and introduced her to someone in Utrecht so she could learn about the field. She earned her Ph.D. from Leiden University (1980) while working on radio emissions from Jupiter. de Pater is a professor of astronomy, earth and planetary science from the University of California, Berkeley, and served as the chair of the Astronomy Department.
In 2015 year, De Pater was named a fellow of the American Geophysical Union who cited her for:

Research 
De Pater's research centers on observations of the large planets and their rings and satellites (Jupiter, Neptune, Titan, and Uranus) using adaptive optics and radio observations. When the Comet Shoemaker–Levy 9 collided with Jupiter in 1994, she led the campaign to observe the impact using the Keck Telescope and the animations of the impact of the comet are readily available to the general public. Her research on the rearrangement of the rings of Uranus indicated they are dynamic feature of the planet and she revealed the presence of new dust belts surrounding Uranus.

Selected publications

Awards and honors 

 C.J. Kok Jury award, Universiteit Leiden (1980)
 John Howard Dellinger Gold Medal, International Union of Radio Science (USRI) (1984)
 Sloan Fellowship (1985)
 Chambliss Award for Writing for Planetary Astrophysics, American Astronomical Society (2007)
 Fellow, American Geophysical Union (2015)
 Oort lecture, Jan Hendrik Oort Foundation and Leiden Observatory (2007)

References 

Fellows of the American Geophysical Union
Leiden University alumni
University of California, Berkeley faculty
Women space scientists
Planetary scientists
Year of birth missing (living people)
Living people